The Neville Hewitt Bridge is a road bridge which spans the Fitzroy River in Rockhampton, Queensland, Australia.  It was officially opened by Queensland premier Sir Joh Bjelke-Petersen on 16 August 1980.

The Neville Hewitt Bridge is the fourth bridge to be constructed across the river at Rockhampton, following the completion of the original Fitzroy Bridge in 1881, the Alexandra Railway Bridge in 1899 and the second Fitzroy Bridge in 1952.

The bridge was named after long-serving local politician Neville Hewitt who served as the Minister for Lands, Forestry and Water Resources.

The Neville Hewitt Bridge currently carries the Bruce Highway across the Fitzroy River, connecting Albert Street in Rockhampton City with Moore's Creek Road in Park Avenue.

Up to 36,000 vehicles use the bridge each day.

However, the Bruce Highway will be diverted upon the completion of the Rockhampton Ring Road, when a new bridge will open upstream to allow vehicles to bypass the city.

There have long been calls from the local community for an additional bridge to be constructed across the Fitzroy River at Rockhampton to ease traffic congestion.

Significant disruption to the city's traffic network has previously occurred when the Neville Hewitt Bridge has been blocked by various accidents.

Though the bridge was built in 1980, local media still describe the Neville Hewitt Bridge as a "new bridge".

References 

Road bridges in Queensland
Buildings and structures in Rockhampton
Bridges completed in 1980
1980 establishments in Australia